Mian Manazir Hussain Ranjha is a Pakistani politician who was a Member of the Provincial Assembly of the Punjab, between 1985 and May 2018 and from August 2018 to January 2023.

Early life and education
He was born on 15 August 1954 in Sargodha District.

He has the degree of Bachelor of Arts and the degree of Bachelor of Laws which he obtained in 1977 from University of the Punjab.

Political career

He was elected to the Provincial Assembly of the Punjab from Constituency PP-66 (Sargodha) in 1985 Pakistani general election. During his tenure as member of the Provincial Assembly of the Punjab, he served as Deputy Speaker of the Punjab Assembly from 1985 to 1988.

He was re-elected to the Provincial Assembly of the Punjab as a candidate of Islami Jamhoori Ittehad (IJI) from Constituency PP-29 (Sargodha) in 1990 Pakistani general election. During his tenure as member of the Provincial Assembly of the Punjab, he again served as Deputy Speaker of the Punjab Assembly from 1990 to 1993.

He was re-elected to the Provincial Assembly of the Punjab as a candidate of Pakistan Peoples Party (PPP) from Constituency PP-29 (Sargodha) in 1993 Pakistani general election.

He was re-elected to the Provincial Assembly of the Punjab as a candidate of Pakistan Muslim League (Q) (PML-Q) from Constituency PP-31 (Sargodha-IV) in 2002 Pakistani general election. He received 29,011 votes and defeated Tanveer Ahmed Midhana, a candidate of PPP.

He ran for the seat of the Provincial Assembly of the Punjab as a candidate of PML-Q from Constituency PP-31 (Sargodha-IV) in 2008 Pakistani general election. He received 20,476 votes and lost the seat to Chaudhry Muhammad Awais Aslam Midhana, a candidate of PPP.

He was re-elected to the Provincial Assembly of the Punjab as a candidate of Pakistan Muslim League (N) (PML-N) from Constituency PP-31 (Sargodha-IV) in 2013 Pakistani general election. He received 29,841 votes and defeated an independent candidate, Muhammad Aslam.

He was re-elected to Provincial Assembly of the Punjab as a candidate of PML-N from Constituency PP-74 (Sargodha-III) in 2018 Pakistani general election.

References

Living people
Punjab MPAs 2013–2018
1954 births
Pakistan Muslim League (N) MPAs (Punjab)
Punjab MPAs 1985–1988
Punjab MPAs 1990–1993
Punjab MPAs 1993–1996
Punjab MPAs 2002–2007
Punjab MPAs 2018–2023